The Kandy Warriors (abbreviated as KW) is a franchise cricket team which competes in 2021 Lanka Premier League. The team is based in Kandy, Central Province, Sri Lanka. In October 2021, Kandy Tuskers changed their name to Kandy Warriors after announced as having new owners. The team was captained by Angelo Perera and coached by Lalchand Rajput.

Current squad 
 Players with international caps are listed in bold.
  denotes a player who is currently unavailable for selection.
  denotes a player who is unavailable for rest of the season.

Administration and support staff

Season standings

League table

League stage

Statistics

Most runs 

 Last updated: 28 January 2022
 Source: ESPNcricinfo

Most wickets 

 Last updated: 28 January 2022
 Source: ESPNcricinfo

References 

2021 Lanka Premier League